The Singel Bridge at the Paleisstraat in Amsterdam is an oil painting made by George Hendrik Breitner in 1896 or 1898. The painting shows people walking on the Singel Bridge at the Paleisstraat in Amsterdam. The painting is in the collection of the Rijksmuseum in Amsterdam.

References

External links 
 

1890s paintings
Amsterdam in art
Paintings in the collection of the Rijksmuseum
Paintings by George Hendrik Breitner
Dogs in art
Bridges in art